Adamovsky District is an administrative and municipal district (raion), one of the thirty-five in Orenburg Oblast, Russia. It is located in the east of the oblast. Its administrative center is the rural locality (a settlement) of Adamovka. Population: 26,079 (2010 Census);  The population of Adamovka accounts for 29.7% of the total district's population.

References

Notes

Sources

Districts of Orenburg Oblast